Jonathan Spilsbury (1737?–1812) was a British engraver, the brother of John Spilsbury, with whom he has sometimes been confused, and father of Maria Spilsbury.

Works
Spilsbury practised chiefly in mezzotint, and between 1759 and 1789 produced many plates, mainly portraits, which included:

 Richard Baxter; 
 John Bunyan, after Thomas Sadler;
 Charles Pratt, 1st Earl Camden, after William Hoare; 
 Miss Jacob, and Frederick Howard, 5th Earl of Carlisle, after Joshua Reynolds; 
 Inigo Jones, after Anthony van Dyck; 
 John Wesley, after George Romney; and 
 George III and Queen Charlotte, from his own drawings.

He also engraved subject-pieces after Murillo, Rembrandt, Rubens, Metzu, Angelica Kauffman, and others For his print of Miss Jacob, Spilsbury was awarded a premium by the Society of Arts in 1761, and for that of the Earl of Carlisle another in 1763. He exhibited original portraits and biblical compositions with the Society of Artists of Great Britain in 1763, 1770, and 1771, and at the Royal Academy from 1776 to 1784. He contributed a picture of The Widow of Zarepta to the British Institution in 1807.

References

Notes

Attribution

English engravers
1737 births
1812 deaths